Michael Dean (born 1977) is a British artist, living and working in London, United Kingdom. In 2016 he was shortlisted for the Turner Prize.

Dean's sculptural work is focused on typefaces. He graduated from Goldsmiths, University of London in 2001 with a BA Fine Art (Studio Practice and Contemporary Critical Theory).

Career 
In 2016, Dean was a Turner Prize nominee. In 2018, he was nominated for the Hepworth Prize for Sculpture.

Dean's solo exhibitions include Government at Henry Moore Institute (2010), Qualities of Violence at De Appel arts centre, Amsterdam (2015), Sic Glyphs at South London Gallery (2016), Lost True Leaves at the Nasher Sculpture Center in Dallas, Texas, U.S.A. (2016), Tender Tender at Westphalian State Museum of Art and Cultural History, Munster and Stamen Papers at Fondazione Giuliani, Rome (2016).

References

External links
Contemporary Art Daily: Michael Dean at Herald St
Michael Dean - Sic Glyphs @ South London Gallery

1977 births
Living people
Alumni of Goldsmiths, University of London
English contemporary artists
British male sculptors